Richvale (also, Richland, Silbys Switch, Silsby) is a small census-designated place (population 244) in Butte County, California, US, south of Chico and west of Oroville.  The primary crop grown in the area surrounding Richvale is rice, irrigated from the Oroville Dam on the Feather River.  Several farmers in the area are known for organic farming. The population was 244 at the 2010 census.

The ZIP Code is 95974. The community is inside area code 530.

History 
Legend says that the name "Richvale" (meaning "fertile valley") was coined by con men to sell worthless plots of land to wheat farmers from Nebraska and Kansas. The developers (Richvale Land Company) changed the name from Selby Switch (a railroad siding) to Richvale in 1909. The place was settled in 1911, and a post office opened that same year.

Farmers in the Midwest were shown lush pictures of California's San Joaquin Valley and Central Valley and sold land at outrageous prices.  The soil near Richvale is nothing like the fertile soil of the San Joaquin Valley, being composed mostly of clay instead of loam. The dominant soil is Esquon clay, a poorly drained vertisol. The locals call the soil "adobe" due to its high clay content.  The land is unsuitable for vineyards, orchards, and most other crops.  Some buyers took one look at the soil and returned to the Midwest. Those who stayed built a community from the muddy ground up: a post office (1912), roads, an irrigation and drainage district, a hotel (1913), a church (1913), a cooperative (1914 and still operating, the Butte County Rice Growers Association), a school (1914), and a grocery store (1920). During a second wave of migration Dust Bowl farmers came west during the Great Depression.

Due to the adobe soil's ability to retain water and remain flooded, the ground makes a near-ideal rice paddy, and rice has become the primary crop of the area.  Irrigation is provided by plentiful surface water from the Feather River.

In 2005,  of rice were served by the Butte County Rice Growers Association. With time and a lot of hard work, the town of Richvale lived up to its name as rice farming provided an abundant livelihood for the original settlers and their offspring.

The history of Richvale was recently written by the Richvale Writing Group (with Teresa Ward) and published by The Community Foundation of Richvale in a book (Richvale: A Legacy of Courage, Dedication, and Perseverance) with 364 historical photographs.

Demographics
The 2010 United States Census reported that Richvale had a population of 244. The racial makeup of Richvale was 216 (88.5%) White, 0 (0.0%) African American, 11 (4.5%) Native American, 0 (0.0%) Asian, 0 (0.0%) Pacific Islander, 10 (4.1%) from other races, and 7 (2.9%) from two or more races. Hispanic or Latino of any race were 27 persons (11.1%).

The Census reported that 244 people (100% of the population) lived in households, 0 (0%) lived in non-institutionalized group quarters, and 0 (0%) were institutionalized.

There were 89 households, out of which 29 (32.6%) had children under the age of 18 living in them, 53 (59.6%) were opposite-sex married couples living together, 5 (5.6%) had a female householder with no husband present, 8 (9.0%) had a male householder with no wife present.  There were 11 (12.4%) unmarried opposite-sex partnerships, and 0 (0%) same-sex married couples or partnerships. 16 households (18.0%) were made up of individuals, and 8 (9.0%) had someone living alone who was 65 years of age or older. The average household size was 2.74.  There were 66 families (74.2% of all households); the average family size was 3.11.

The population was spread out, with 64 people (26.2%) under the age of 18, 15 people (6.1%) aged 18 to 24, 56 people (23.0%) aged 25 to 44, 65 people (26.6%) aged 45 to 64, and 44 people (18.0%) who were 65 years of age or older.  The median age was 40.5 years. For every 100 females, there were 112.2 males.  For every 100 females age 18 and over, there were 104.5 males.

The homeowner vacancy rate was 1.4%; the rental vacancy rate was 0%.  192 people (78.7% of the population) lived in owner-occupied housing units and 52 people (21.3%) lived in rental housing units.

Places of interest
 Richvale Airport, 1764 Richvale Highway
 Richvale Cafe, 5285 Midway
 Richvale Elementary School, 5236 Church Street
 Richvale Evangelical Free Church, 5219 Church Street
 Richvale Fire Department, 1236 School Street
 Richvale Post Office (ZIP Code 95974), 1259 Broadway
 Lundberg Family Farms, 5370 Church Street

Notable People
 Doug LaMalfa, U.S. Representative of California's 1st congressional district

References

Census-designated places in Butte County, California
Populated places established in 1911
Census-designated places in California